Emmanuel Anui Kofie (10 February 1943 – 2 May 2020) was a Ghanaian soccer player who played in the NASL.

Death
Kofie died in May 2020, after the effects of a stroke suffered years prior.

Career statistics

Club

Notes

References

1943 births
2020 deaths
Ghanaian footballers
Ghana international footballers
Ghanaian expatriate footballers
Association football goalkeepers
Accra Great Olympics F.C. players
Asante Kotoko S.C. players
New York Cosmos players
North American Soccer League (1968–1984) players
Expatriate soccer players in the United States
Ghanaian expatriate sportspeople in the United States